The Prix Jean de Chaudenay was a Group 2 flat horse race in France open to thoroughbreds aged four years or older. It was run at Saint-Cloud over a distance of 2,400 metres (about 1½ miles), and it was scheduled to take place each year in May or June.

History
The event was established in 1920, and it was originally called the Grand Prix du Printemps. It was held on the French public holiday of Lundi de Pentecôte. It was initially open to horses aged three or older, and run over 2,600 metres. It was cut to 2,500 metres in 1923, and to 2,400 metres in 1929.

The race was renamed in memory of Jean de Chaudenay (1870–1967), a former president of the Société Sportive d'Encouragement, in the late 1960s. It was abandoned due to student protests in 1968, and first run with its new title in 1969.

The present system of race grading was introduced in 1971, and the Prix Jean de Chaudenay was classed at Group 2 level.

The race was closed to three-year-olds in 1994. It was contested at Deauville over 2,500 metres in 1996. It was last run in 2003.

Another event, the Prix Hubert de Chaudenay, became known as the Prix Chaudenay in 2004. It now honours both father and son, Jean and Hubert de Chaudenay.

Records
Most successful horse since 1959 (2 wins):
 Boyatino – 1988, 1989
 Dear Doctor – 1991, 1992

Leading jockey since 1959 (6 wins):
 Yves Saint-Martin – Negresco (1960), Catilina (1962), Psyche (1967), Ashmore (1975), Maitland (1976), Welsh Term (1983)

Leading trainer since 1959 (6 wins):
 François Mathet – Negresco (1960), Dicta Drake (1961), Catilina (1962), Direct Flight (1973), Diagramatic (1977), Vayrann (1981)

Leading owner since 1959 (6 wins):
 Daniel Wildenstein – Felicio (1969), Ashmore (1975), Maitland (1976), Seurat (1985), Lascaux (1987), First Magnitude (2000)

Winners since 1970

 Millenary finished first in 2003, but he was relegated to second place following a stewards' inquiry.

Earlier winners
 1921: Polidora
 1922: Kircubbin 
 1923: Mirebeau
 1924: Le Debardeur
 1925: Pitchoury
 1926: Feu Follet
 1927: Fortunio
 1928: Tape a l'Oeil
 1929: Coligny
 1930: Delate
 1931: Raeburn
 1932: Papillon Rose
 1933: Le Cacique
 1934: Lilium

 1935: Saint Fiacre
 1936: Lorenzo de' Medici
 1937: Mousson
 1938: Sirtam
 1939: Talma
 1941: Pizzicato
 1942: Cordon Rouge
 1943: Sir Fellah
 1944: Seer
 1946: Elseneur
 1947: Narses
 1949: Tanagrello
 1950: Springfield
 1951: L'Amiral

 1952: Mat de Cocagne
 1953: Signal
 1954: Soleil Levant
 1955: Norsemour
 1956: Defensal
 1957: Yvre
 1958: Malefaim
 1959: Nagami
 1960: Negresco
 1961: Dicta Drake
 1962: Catilina
 1963: Blanc Bleu
 1964: Royal Avenue
 1965: Demi Deuil
 1966: Vasco de Gama
 1967: Psyche
 1968: no race
 1969: Felicio

See also
 List of French flat horse races
 Recurring sporting events established in 1920 – this race is included under its original title, Grand Prix du Printemps.

References

 France Galop / Racing Post:
 galop.courses-france.com:
 1974–1979, 1980–2003
 france-galop.com – A Brief History: Prix Chaudenay.
 galopp-sieger.de – Prix Jean de Chaudenay (ex Grand Prix du Printemps).
 pedigreequery.com – Prix Jean de Chaudenay – Saint-Cloud.

Horse races in France
Saint-Cloud Racecourse
Open middle distance horse races
Discontinued horse races